Singular is a band from Thailand. The group includes "Sin" (born on 1 October 1985), a singer-songwriter who has performed with the Bangkok Opera, and "Nut" (born on 12 August 1986), the band's guitarist who won a gold medal at the national guitar awards). Their musical character is likened to the Metro-Acoustic style.

History 

In May 2010, Singular released its first ever single "24.7 (Twenty-Four Seven)", which reached number one on top radio charts all over Thailand. The music video for "24.7" also reached 590,000 views after three months on YouTube.

Singular's second single "Bao Bao (Tender)" catapulted the band to greater heights with over four million views on [YouTube. Within two weeks of its release, "Bao Bao" also reached number one on top radio charts all over the Thailand and the phrase "lyric for Bao Bao / Singular" became the sixth most searched phrase on Google Zeitgeist (20–26 September 2010). The song won a number of national music and media awards, including "Song of the Year" and "Best New Acts" for Thailand.

Singular also worked on an international single with the Japanese guitar duo, Depapepe. Their joint single release is called "Some Other Day", which was written by Sin, while incorporating an existing instrumental piece by Depapepe, "Kitto Mata Itsuka".

Discography

Albums

2011 The White Room -Decoration- (Peak Chart Position 1) 

 ONE
 Try
 เบาเบา (Tender)
 GAME
 Days
 More
 24.7 (Twenty four Seven)
 Worless
 FADE
 Some Other Day feat. Depapepe
 24.7 (acoustic) (bonus track)

EPs

2010 The White Room 

 24.7 (Twenty four Seven)
 ลอง (Try)
 เบาเบา (Tender)
 Game
 อีกวัน (Days)
 Faded.acoustic
 24.7 (acoustic)

Singles

2010

2011

DVD 

2011 The White Room -decoration-

Others

2011 
 Lom Nhao (Jazz Version) – Compilation album ‘Bossa in Love’

(Peak Chart position referenced from National Top Charts)

Awards 
 ‘Most Favorite Song’ for 'Bao Bao (Tender)' FAT Awards 2011
 ‘Best Art Direction’ for ‘24.7’ Channel [V] Thailand Music Video Awards 2011
 ‘Popular New Artist’ Channel [V] Thailand Music Video Awards 2011
 'No.1 Music Chart (May) 2011' for 'ONE' by Intensive Watch
 'Song of The Year' for 'Bao Bao (Tender)' by Bang Awards 2011
 'Lyric of The Year' for 'Bao Bao (Tender)' by Bang Awards 2011
 'Group/Duo of The Year' by Bang Awards 2011
 'No.1 Music Chart 2010' for 'Bao Bao (Tender)' by Intensive Watch
 'Song of The Year' for 'Bao Bao (Tender)' by Nine Entertain Awards 2011
 'Group/Duo Artist of The Year' by Nine Entertain Awards 2011
 'Most Popular Song of The Year' for 'Bao Bao (Tender)' by Seed Awards 2011
 'Best Group/Duo Artist' by Seed Awards 2011
 'Best Newcomer Artist' by Seed Awards 2011
 'Most Click Music Video' by You2Play Awards 2011
 'Top Talk-about in Music' by MThai Awards 2011
 'Greatz Group' by VirginHitz Awards 2012

External links 
  Singular fanpage

References 
 Sony Music Thailand
  Mthai Scoop
 Singular Press conference
 you2play.com
 Seedspace
 Bang Channel
 Nine Entertain Awards 2011
  intensivewatch.com

Thai pop music groups
Musical groups from Bangkok
Thai musical duos
Thai YouTubers